KJGT (88.3 FM) is a radio station licensed to Waconia, Minnesota.  KJGT airs a Christian format and is owned by Minn-Iowa Christian Broadcasters.

References

External links
KJGT's official website

Christian radio stations in Minnesota